The Breakers was a rock band from Denmark consisting of Toke Nisted (vocals), Anders Bruus (guitar) and Jackie Larsen (bass). They were influenced by the music of the 60s and 70s, such as The Faces and The Rolling Stones.

History 
The Breakers was founded in Copenhagen, Denmark in 2002. Their first album, What I Want, was released in January 2004 on Sony Denmark. Their second album, Here For A Laugh, was released in Denmark in January 2006 on Good Guy's Recording Company and later in USA and Canada in May 2007 on Funzalo Records. The US/Canada release was sent out under the name "The Breakers DK", as they had to add the "DK" to differentiate themselves from other bands named "the Breakers".

The band performed at the Danish musical festival SPOT in 2005 (SPOT11), a festival renowned for showcasing the premier Danish musical talent.

In May 2007 Steven Van Zandt named the band's first US single “Dance the Go-Go” the Coolest Song in The World on his Underground Garage radio show. The Breakers signed a record contract in June 2008 with Wicked Cool Records run and owned by Steven Van Zandt.

The band performed at South by Southwest music festival in 2009. The band closed the second stage at Hard Rock Calling on June 27, 2010 right before Paul McCartney played the main stage.

The Breakers recorded their third album in May 2010 in Stratosphere Sound in New York. Steven Van Zandt has produced the album and co-written several tracks. The album is mixed by Bob Clearmountain and is released June 6, 2011.

Continuing with their relationship with Steven van Zandt, in 2012, The Breakers appeared in S1:E6 of Lilyhammer, a Norwegian television series that stars Van Zandt and lists him as an executive producer.

The band split up in late 2012.

Discography

References

External links 
 The Breakers website
 
 
 The Breakers Record Label
 Underground Garage playlist

Danish alternative rock groups
Musical groups established in 2002
2002 establishments in Denmark